= Maliha cemetery =

Burial site in Mleiha, United Arab Emirates

Mleiha cemetery (Arabic: مدفن مليحة) is an archaeological burial site located in the Mleiha area near the Mleiha Archaeological Centre in the United Arab Emirates, approximately 50 kilometers east of Sharjah city. The cemetery contains the Umm Al Nar tomb, which is considered one of the most impressive burial structures compared to those discovered in ancient burial sites in the Mleiha area. This burial site, constructed around 2300 BCE, was used for nearly 200 years.

== Discovery ==
This cemetery was discovered by the local archaeological mission of the Sharjah Department of Antiquities in 1998 within a date palm farm. Subsequent discoveries included a stone drainage channel believed to have been used for rainwater drainage, as well as other original stones from the tomb's walls found in the surrounding palm gardens. These stones were partially used later for the reconstruction and restoration of the tomb.
